Antonina Ordina (born 24 January 1962 in Naryan-Mar) is a former Soviet/Swedish cross-country skier who competed at international level from 1985 to 2002. In Soviet time she trained at Dynamo in Kalinin. She won three medals at the FIS Nordic World Ski Championships, with a gold in the 4 × 5 km relay (1987 and bronzes in the 30 km and the 4 × 5 km relay (both 1995).

Ordina's best individual finish at the Winter Olympics was seventh in the 15 km event at Lillehammer in 1994. She also has nineteen victories at various levels in various distances from 1992 to 2002.

She became a Swedish citizen in 1994. She graduated from the Swedish Police Academy in 2007 and works as a police officer in Karlstad, Värmland County.

Cross-country skiing results
All results are sourced from the International Ski Federation (FIS).

Olympic Games

World Championships

 3 medals – (1 gold, 2 bronze)

World Cup

Season standings

Individual podiums

8 podiums

Team podiums

 2 victories 
 5 podiums

Note:   Until the 1999 World Championships and the 1994 Olympics, World Championship and Olympic races were included in the World Cup scoring system.

References

External links 

 
 World Championship results 

1962 births
Living people
Swedish female cross-country skiers
Soviet female cross-country skiers
Dynamo sports society athletes
Cross-country skiers at the 1994 Winter Olympics
Cross-country skiers at the 1998 Winter Olympics
Russian emigrants to Sweden
People from Naryan-Mar
FIS Nordic World Ski Championships medalists in cross-country skiing
Olympic cross-country skiers of Sweden
Naturalized citizens of Sweden
Swedish police officers
Sportspeople from Nenets Autonomous Okrug